Amalfitano is a surname. Notable people with the surname include:

Joey Amalfitano (born 1934), American baseball player, manager, and coach 
Morgan Amalfitano (born 1985), French footballer
Romain Amalfitano (born 1989), French footballer, brother of Morgan